Below is a list of Field Armies of the United States

Active Theater Armies
First United States Army (United States Army Forces Command)
United States Army Central (United States Central Command)
United States Army North (United States Northern Command)
United States Army South (United States Southern Command)
United States Army Europe and Africa (United States European Command, United States Africa Command)

Active Field Armies 

 Eighth United States Army  (United States Forces Korea)

Inactive
Second United States Army (United States Cyber Command)
Fourth United States Army
Tenth United States Army
Fourteenth United States Army (fictional)
Fifteenth United States Army

Field armies